is a railway station in the town of Yuza, Yamagata, Japan, operated by East Japan Railway Company (JR East).

Lines
Fukura Station is served by the Uetsu Main Line, and is located 186.1 km from the starting point of the line at Niitsu Station.

Station layout
The station has one side platform and one island platform connected by a footbridge. The station is unattended.

Platforms

History
Fukura Station opened on July 30, 1920. The station has been unattended since October 1981. With the privatization of JNR on April 1, 1987, the station came under the control of JR East.

Surrounding area
 Jūroku Rakan Iwa

References

External links

 JR East Station information 

Railway stations in Japan opened in 1920
Railway stations in Yamagata Prefecture
Uetsu Main Line
Yuza, Yamagata